Tabernaemontana pauciflora is a species of plant in the family Apocynaceae.

Description
The bark is pale grey to grey-brown. Inflorescences bear up to 15 flowers. The fragrant flowers feature white, sometimes yellow-throated, corolla lobes.

Name
The specific epithet  is Latin for "few-flowered". Tabernaemontana pauciflora is native to Burma, Thailand, Cambodia, Vietnam, Borneo, Peninsular Malaysia, Singapore, Java and Sumatra.

References

pauciflora
Plants described in 1826
Flora of Indo-China
Flora of Malesia